The 14 municipalities of the Ostrobothnia Region in Finland are divided into four sub-regions. Both their location and the dominant language imply these divisions; Kyrönmaa, for example, is Finnish-speaking, whereas the others have Swedish-speakers in the majority. Most places have both Swedish and Finnish names.



Jakobstad sub-region 
Kronoby
Larsmo
Jakobstad
Pedersöre
Nykarleby

Sydösterbotten sub-region 
Kaskinen
Kristinestad
Närpes

Vaasa sub-region 
Korsnäs
Laihia
Malax
Korsholm
Vaasa
Vörå

See also 
Western Finland
Regions of Western Finland

External links